The 12th Texas Infantry Regiment, sometimes known as the 8th Texas Infantry, was a unit of volunteers recruited in Texas that fought in the Confederate States Army during the American Civil War. In spring 1862, the regiment was enrolled in Confederate service at Waco, Texas, and always remained west of the Mississippi River in the area known as the Trans-Mississippi Department. The unit was assigned to the all-Texas infantry division known as Walker's Greyhounds. In 1863, the regiment played a minor role at Milliken's Bend. In April 1864, the regiment fought in three major battles at Mansfield, Pleasant Hill, and Jenkins' Ferry. The Trans-Mississippi's formal surrender occurred on 26 May 1865, but most of the soldiers dispersed to their homes before that date.

References

 

Units and formations of the Confederate States Army from Texas
1862 establishments in Texas
Military units and formations established in 1862
1865 disestablishments in Texas
Military units and formations disestablished in 1865